Shelburne Playhouse is a historic theatre located at Ferndale in Sullivan County, New York.  It was built in 1922 as part of a small resort known as the Shelburne Hotel and used as the hotel social hall.  It is a long, rectangular wood-frame building, 95 feet long and 35 feet wide. It consists of two components: a large five-by-four-bay structure that houses the main seating area / dance hall and a slightly lower three-by-one-bay entrance pavilion.  The building is coated in stucco with applied wooden battens and a surmounted by a gable roof in the Tudor Revival style.

It was added to the National Register of Historic Places in 2004.  With Maurice Gerry, Allan Bérubé (1946–2007) coordinated its restoration and initiated its being placed on the New York State and national register.

References

External links
"Cornell preservation students and alumni revive historic Catskill theater," By Linda Myers, Cornell University
National Register Celebrates Preservation Week -- Liberty, New York, May 2005

Theatres on the National Register of Historic Places in New York (state)
Theatres in New York (state)
Tudor Revival architecture in New York (state)
Theatres completed in 1922
Buildings and structures in Sullivan County, New York
National Register of Historic Places in Sullivan County, New York
1922 establishments in New York (state)